Kızılcabölükspor is a football club located in Denizli, Turkey. The club was promoted to the TFF Third League after 2012–13 season. TFF THIRD LEAGUE .

League participations 
TFF Third League: 2013–present
Turkish Regional Amateur League: 2012–2013

Stadium 
Currently the team plays at Kızılcabölük Semt Stadium.

Current squad

References

External links 
Official website
Kızılcabölükspor on TFF.org

TFF Third League clubs
Football clubs in Turkey
Association football clubs established in 1982
1982 establishments in Turkey